Larry Seivers (born March 30, 1954) is a former American football wide receiver who played college football at the University of Tennessee. He was drafted by the Seattle Seahawks of the National Football League (NFL) in the fourth round of the 1977 NFL Draft. He was a consensus All-American in 1975 and 1976.

Early years
Seivers played high school football and basketball for the Clinton High School Dragons in Clinton, Tennessee.

College career
Seivers played for the Tennessee Volunteers from 1974 to 1976. He accumulated 117 receptions, 1,924 receiving yards and eight receiving touchdowns in his career. At the time he was the University of Tennessee's all-time leader in receptions and receiving yards. He was a two time consensus All-American in 1975 and 1976. Seivers scored the only touchdown of the 1974 Liberty Bowl, catching an 11-yard pass from Randy Wallace, in a 7-3 victory over Maryland. He was a captain on the 1976 Tennessee Volunteers football team. He was selected as an SEC Football Legend in 2005. Seivers was inducted into the Tennessee Sports Hall of Fame in 2013.

Professional career
Sievers was drafted by the Seattle Seahawks of the NFL with the 111th pick in the 1977 NFL Draft. He was traded to the Tampa Bay Buccaneers on August 30, 1977 for a fourth round 1979 NFL Draft choice. The draft pick received by the Seahawks was given to the Buffalo Bills as voluntary compensation for Ahmad Rashad signing in 1976.

References

Living people
1954 births
American football wide receivers
Tennessee Volunteers football players
All-American college football players
Seattle Seahawks players
Tampa Bay Buccaneers players
Players of American football from Tennessee
People from Clinton, Tennessee